Cherokee Casino Will Rogers Downs is a gaming facility and horse racing track located in Rogers County, near Tulsa, Oklahoma and immediately east of Justice. The track is owned and operated by the Cherokee Nation. 

Quarter Horse races are held September-to-November. Thoroughbred horse racing takes place from March-to-May. The track also features Appaloosa and Paint races.

The facility features a 2,700-seat grandstand along a one-mile long track. The facility's casino section has 250 electronic gaming machines. Also, on the grounds of the Downs complex is the largest RV park in Oklahoma.

References

External links
 

Cherokee Nation buildings and structures
Horse racing venues in Oklahoma
Buildings and structures in Rogers County, Oklahoma
Sports venues in Oklahoma
Casinos in Oklahoma
Horse racing in Oklahoma
Native American casinos
Native American history of Oklahoma